Borrowed Hero is a 1941 American film directed by Lewis D. Collins.

Plot 
A knowledgeable newspaper reporter helps a young prosecutor fight organized crime in a city.

Cast 
Alan Baxter as Roger Andrews
Florence Rice as Ann Thompson
Constance Worth as Mona Brooks
John Hamilton as William Brooks
Mary Gordon as Mrs. Riley
Marlo Dwyer as Carol Turner
Stanley Andrews as Mr. Taylor, Defense Attorney
Richard Terry as Dixie Nelson
Jerry Marlowe as Johnny Gray
Paul Everton as Trial Judge
Guy Usher as District Attorney
John Maxwell as City Editor

References

External links 

1941 films
American crime drama films
1941 romantic drama films
1940s action drama films
American adventure drama films
1940s English-language films
American black-and-white films
Monogram Pictures films
American romantic drama films
1941 crime drama films
Films directed by Lewis D. Collins
1940s American films